Lütfullah Kayalar (born 1952 in Yozgat, Turkey) is a Turkish lawyer from profession and politician, who served twice as government minister.
He graduated from the Law School of Ankara University with a Bachelor of Laws degree. He entered politics as a member of the Motherland Party, and was elected into the parliament as Deputy of Yozgat. Lütfullah Kayalar served in the cabinet of Turgut Özal and later of Yıldırım Akbulut as Minister of Agriculture, Forestry and Rural Affairs between 1989 and 1991, and in the cabinet of Mesut Yılmaz as Minister of Finance in 1996.

At the Motherland Party's 7th congress held on August 4–5, 2001 in Ankara, he ran for the party leadership against Mesut Yılmaz, however without success.
 
Before the 2007 general election, the two liberal parties, Democratic Party and the Motherland Party, which he was a member of, wanted to merge in order to contest the elections as one party. However, as this intention failed, Lütfullah Kayalar left his party and entered on June 2, 2007 the Republican People's Party, a center-left party, accepting the invitation of its leader Deniz Baykal.

He is of Yöruk ancestry.

References

1952 births
People from Yozgat
Ankara University Faculty of Law alumni
Living people
Ministers of Finance of Turkey
Government ministers of Turkey
Motherland Party (Turkey) politicians
Republican People's Party (Turkey) politicians
Members of the 21st Parliament of Turkey
Members of the 20th Parliament of Turkey
20th-century Turkish lawyers
21st-century Turkish lawyers